GP3 may refer to:

 GP3 Series, an open-wheeler motor racing series launched in 2010
 Grand Prix 3, a racing simulator game
 .gp3, format used by Guitar Pro
 1999 GP3 or (17055) 1999 GP3, a minor planet

See also

 Moto3, motorcycle GP class 3
 GPPP, global public–private partnership
 3GP, a file format
 
 G3P (disambiguation) (disambiguation)
 GP (disambiguation)